Baard Henrik Slagsvold (born 31 August 1963 in Elverum, Norway) is a Norwegian pop and jazz musician (vocals, piano, double bass and drums), and are particularly known as the bassist and singer in the pop trio Tre Små Kinesere (1989–2005).

Career 
Slagsvold had sung and played in several bands before he joined the "Tre Små Kinesere", including "Fort & Gæli" and "Appelzin Juice Studentz" from Elverum, and he also vas vocalist and played drums in the band "Skjønn Forening" from Oslo, and "Kaare og partiet". He attended the Jazz program at Trondheim Musikkonsevatorium, with the piano as main instrument, but started the double bass within "Tre Små Kinesere", because Øystein Hegge already was the pianist.

Slagsvold has also played with the rock band "Motorpsycho" from Trondheim, the pop trio "Skrujern", started in 1994, and within "Norsk Utflukt" where he primarily played the piano and bass, with the author Lars Saabye Christensen as vocalist. He was also co-composer together with Kåre Virud, in "Norsk Utflukt", while also playing in "Kåre Virud Band". Slagsvold has also been a studio musician and performed within his own Baard Slagsvold Quartet.

Discography 
Within Skjønn Forening
1985: Livsskvadroner (Bring Back Beat Records)

Within Tre Små Kinesere
1990: 365 Fri (CBS)
1991: Luftpalass (CBS, Columbia)
1992: Vær Sær (Sony Music Entertainment, Norway)
2002: De Aller Beste Fra Tre Små Kinesere (Columbia)

Within Motorpsycho
1999: Let Them Eat Cake (Stickman Records, Germany)
2000: Walkin' With J (Stickman Records, Germany)
2001: Barracuda (Stickman Records, Germany)
2001: Phanerothyme (Columbia)
2002: It's A Love Cult (Stickman Records, Germany)
2002: In The Fishtank (Konkurrent Records), with Jaga Jazzist Horns

Within Norsk Utflukt
2008: Med Lyset På (Grammofon)

With other projects
1995: Katzenjammer Für Frauentimmer (Hund Productions Int.), with "Schweinhund»
1999: Bønder I Solnedgang (Norske Gram), with Hans Rotmo & "Skrujern»
2005: Det Beste Til Meg Og Mine Venner (JEPS, Big Dipper Records), a tribute to Joachim Nielsen

References

External links 
Baard Slagsvold Biography at "Tre Små Kinesere" Official website

20th-century Norwegian upright-bassists
21st-century Norwegian upright-bassists
20th-century Norwegian pianists
21st-century Norwegian pianists
Norwegian jazz upright-bassists
Male double-bassists
Norwegian jazz pianists
Norwegian composers
Norwegian male composers
Norwegian male singers
Norwegian University of Science and Technology alumni
1963 births
Living people
Musicians from Elverum
Norwegian male pianists
20th-century Norwegian male musicians
21st-century Norwegian male musicians
Male jazz musicians